Santa Ana District is one of 13 districts of the province Castrovirreyna in Peru.

See also 
 Aknuqucha
 Chuqlluqucha
 Urququcha

References